The 2019 Open d'Orléans was a professional tennis tournament played on indoor hard courts. It was the fifteenth edition of the tournament which was part of the 2019 ATP Challenger Tour. It took place in Orléans, France between 23 and 29 September 2019.

Singles main-draw entrants

Seeds

 1 Rankings are as of 16 September 2019.

Other entrants
The following players received wildcards into the singles main draw:
  Geoffrey Blancaneaux
  Antoine Cornut Chauvinc
  Rayane Roumane
  Luca Vanni
  Mikael Ymer

The following players received entry from the qualifying draw:
  Viktor Durasovic
  Hugo Nys

Champions

Singles

 Mikael Ymer def.  Grégoire Barrère 6–3, 7–5.

Doubles

 Romain Arneodo /  Hugo Nys def.  Hans Podlipnik Castillo /  Tristan-Samuel Weissborn 6–7(5–7), 6–3, [10–1].

References